Eoconus is an extinct genus of sea snails, marine gastropod mollusks, in the family Conidae, the cone snails and their allies.

Species
Species within the genus Eoconus include:
 † Eoconus bareti (Vasseur, 1882)
 † Eoconus derelictus (Deshayes, 1865)
 † Eoconus diversiformis (Deshayes, 1835)
 † Eoconus sauridens (Conrad, 1833)
 † Eoconus sulciferus (Deshayes, 1835)
 † Eoconus veteratoris Tracey & Craig, 2017

References

 Conrad, Timothy Abbott. "ART. XVII. On some new Fossil and Recent Shells of the United States." American Journal of Science and Arts (1820-1879) 23.2 (1833): 339.